Shmuel Katz may refer to:

Shmuel Katz (politician) (1914–2008), Israeli writer, historian and Knesset member
Shmuel Katz (artist) (1926–2010), Israeli artist and cartoonist
Shmuel Katz (violist), principal of the Mostly Mozart Orchestra

See also 
 Samuel Katz (disambiguation)